FC Khimik Dankov was a Russian football team from Dankov. It played professionally for one season, in Russian Third Division Zone 2 in 1994, taking 6th place.

External links
  Team history at KLISF

Association football clubs established in 1993
Association football clubs disestablished in 1995
Defunct football clubs in Russia
Sport in Lipetsk Oblast
1993 establishments in Russia
1995 disestablishments in Russia